Style is a 2001 Indian Hindi language comedy thriller film directed by N. Chandra. Sharman Joshi and Sahil Khan made their debut in the Indian Film Industry as duo named Chantu and Bantu. According to MenXp the film was an instant hit. A sequel titled Xcuse Me was released in 2003. Fifteen years since its release, MensXp in its review in 2018, called the movie a cult hit. Made on a budget of ₹2.5 crore, it earned ₹8.84 crore in its entire playing period.

Plot 
The film revolves round two slap-happy college students, Bantu/Nehal (Sharman Joshi) and Chantu/Amit (Sahil Khan), who stand out in the college for their expertise in ragging and playing pranks, and ability to outfox others.
As their college life nears an end, the duo begin to realize that they need to start getting more serious about their life and career. Realising that they are not cut out for a life of struggle and hard work, Bantu comes up with an idea to trick two rich girls into marrying them so that they can spend their lives comfortably which lead them to focus their attention on rich teenyboppers Sheena (Riya Sen) and Rani (Shilpi Mudgal) and set about wooing the two girls to win their love and ultimately the key to becoming rich. A mysterious woman named Nikki Malhotra (Tara Deshpande) enters the scene, and pretty soon Chantu and Bantu get embroiled in a murder mystery.

Cast 
Sharman Joshi as Nehal Shah (Bantu) / Rosa Mary Marlow
Sahil Khan as Amit Malik (Chantu) / Reshma Chaudhary
Riya Sen as Sheena
Shillpi Sharma as Rani
Varsha Usgaonkar as Inspector
Tara Deshpande as Nikki Malhotra
Darshan Jariwala as Principal Sardesai
Shakti Kapoor as Suresh Bhagwat
Vishwajeet Pradhan as Nayansukh
Neelu Kohli as Bantu's Mother
Atul Parchure as Manager
Sikandar Kharbanda as Jarie
Rajkumar Kanojia as Sharad Kandi Bhagwat
Lilliput as Hostel Manager
Puneet Vashisht as Vicky
Rinke Ali Khan as Savitri

Soundtrack 
The music score was given by Sanjeev Darshan. The lyrics are written by Nitin Raikwar, Tejpal Kaur and Abbas Katka. The tune of the song "Mohabbat Ho Na Jaye" is a copy of the Egyptian artist Amr Diab's song "Habibi Ya Nour El Ain" .

Sequel 
A sequel Xcuse Me was released in 2003.

References

External links 
 

2001 films
2001 romantic comedy films
Indian romantic comedy films
2000s Hindi-language films
Films directed by N. Chandra
Hindi-language comedy films
Hindi-language romance films